The thirtieth government of Israel was formed by Ariel Sharon on 28 February 2003, following Likud's comprehensive victory in the January elections. His coalition initially included Shinui and the National Union, holding 60 of the 120 seats in the Knesset, whilst the two-seat Yisrael BaAliyah merged into Likud shortly after. The National Religious Party also joined the coalition on 3 March 2003, taking the number of seats it held up to 66.

The government became increasingly unstable due to the Gaza disengagement plan, with the National Union leaving the coalition on 6 June 2004, and the National Religious Party following on 11 November. On 4 December Shinui also left the government following disagreements over the budget. On 10 January 2005, Labor-Meimad joined the government, and was joined by Agudat Yisrael on 30 March.

On 23 November 2005 Sharon and several other ministers left Likud to establish Kadima (initially known as National Responsibility), remaining in control of the government. Although Labor-Meimad left the government on the same day, Sharon remained in control until suffering a stroke on 4 January 2006, at which point Acting Prime Minister Ehud Olmert took temporary control. Although Likud left the government on 15 January, Olmert became Interim Prime Minister on 16 April, and remained head of the government until he formed the thirty-first government on 4 May 2006, following Kadima's victory in the March elections.

Cabinet members

1 Although Sharansky was not an MK at the time of his appointment, he had been elected to the Knesset on the Yisrael BaAliyah list.

References

External links
Sixteenth Knesset: Government 30 Knesset website

 30
Ariel Sharon
2003 establishments in Israel
2006 disestablishments in Israel
Cabinets established in 2003
Cabinets disestablished in 2006
2003 in Israeli politics
2004 in Israeli politics
2005 in Israeli politics
2006 in Israeli politics
 30